The Omulyakh Bay is a bay of the East Siberian Sea in the Sakha Republic (Yakutia), Russian Federation.

Geography
This bay is located in the shores of the East Siberian Lowland, west of the Sundrun River region and east of the Yana Bay.

Omulyakh Bay is open to the east through a narrow and straight channel and is 115 km in length. It has a curved inlet at its end. The Khroma Bay is very similar to this bay and lies only 40 km south. Both bays share the same mouth.

Hydrography  
The bay is in an area of wetlands; lakes and marshes dot the whole landscape. Owing to is northerly location the Omullyakh Bay is covered with ice most of the year.

References

External links 
 Location
 YakutiaToday.Com - Geography of the Sakha Republic (Yakutia)

Bays of the Sakha Republic
Bays of the East Siberian Sea
East Siberian Lowland